Konstantin Belevich (born 16 June 1968) is a Belarusian rower. He competed in the men's quadruple sculls event at the 1996 Summer Olympics.

References

1968 births
Living people
Belarusian male rowers
Olympic rowers of Belarus
Rowers at the 1996 Summer Olympics
Place of birth missing (living people)